Đorđe Majstorović (born 13 March 1990) is a Serbian professional basketball player for Čačak 94 of the Second Basketball League of Serbia. He plays as a center and a power forward.

During the 2017–18 season, Majstorović played for MZT Skopje of the Macedonian League. In August 2021, he signed for Čačak 94 of the Second Basketball League of Serbia.

References

External links
 Profile at aba-liga.com
 Profile at eurobasket.com

Living people
1990 births
ABA League players
Basketball League of Serbia players
Basketball players from Čačak
Competitors at the 2013 Mediterranean Games
KK Borac Čačak players
KK Crvena zvezda youth players
KK Čačak 94 players
KK Metalac Valjevo players
KK MZT Skopje players
KK Mladost Čačak players
KK Partizan players
KK Smederevo players
Mediterranean Games silver medalists for Serbia
Serbian expatriate basketball people in North Macedonia
Serbian expatriate basketball people in Spain
Serbian expatriate basketball people in Slovenia
Serbian men's basketball players
Universiade medalists in basketball
Mediterranean Games medalists in basketball
Universiade bronze medalists for Serbia
Centers (basketball)
Power forwards (basketball)
Medalists at the 2013 Summer Universiade
Helios Suns players